The 1991 Vitesse du Mans motorcycle Grand Prix was the penultimate round of the 1991 Grand Prix motorcycle racing season. It took place on the weekend of 6–8 September 1991 at the Bugatti Circuit located in Le Mans. France.

Originally meant to be held in Brazil, that race was cancelled for safety reasons, so the FIM decided to add a second French round. It is the only time in FIM Grand Prix motorcycle racing history two rounds were held in France during a season. The race's name was used for this race only, after the European Grand Prix moniker had been used for a race in Jarama that replaced the Yugoslavian race.

500 cc race report

John Kocinski on pole. Kevin Schwantz gets the start from Kocinski, Mick Doohan, Wayne Gardner and Wayne Rainey.

Schwantz and Doohan battle for 1st, but at ten laps to go, Rainey just needs to stay in 3rd place to win the championship.

Rainey speculates that Kocinski let him take 3rd so he could win the championship, though he told team manager Kenny Roberts he didn't want Kocinski's help.

Kenny Roberts: "There were a lot of races where we shouldn't have won, and we really wouldn't have won if it wasn't for Wayne. There's a lot of races where had we had anyone else, it wouldn't have happened. Wayne was very, very determined to win it this year.  Some years you can say the bikes were definitely better or our engineering was better, but this year Wayne was definitely better."

500cc classification

References

Vitesse du Mans Grand Prix
Vitesse du Mans Grand Prix
French motorcycle Grand Prix
Vitesse du Mans Grand Prix
Vitesse
Vitesse du Mans Grand Prix